Bernardo Vieira de Souza (born 20 May 1990), better known as Bernardo, is a Brazilian professional footballer who currently plays as an attacking midfielder for Rio Branco.

Club career
Bernardo was promoted to professionals in 2009 to the professional team of Cruzeiro, after a distinguished in Copa São Paulo de Juniores, where he was the top scorer.

Bernardo's professional debut was the victory against the 5x0 Guarani-MG State Championship in 2009. The player was surprised by injuries to three companions, who forced the coach Adilson Batista to use it more frequently in comprissos Cruise: Wágner, the holder of the position, suffering a left thigh strain. The left lateral Fernandinho suffered a serious injury to cruciate ligament rupture in the knee, and the idol Sorín lacked the conditions to act on the side due to pain in the heel. That made the substitute for Wagner, Gerson Magrão, was improvised on the left, thus making room for the entry of Bernard on the team.

The player has been repeatedly praised by coach Adilson Batista, who, however, highlighted as points francs which must be corrected to immaturity and lack of attention to positioning on the pitch when your team does not have the ball. The player humbly grateful for the advice of the coach and is willing to improve.

The first goal from Bernardo in professional football was a penalty that he himself suffered in the rout of 7x0 against the Democrata.

In May 2010, Bernando was loaned to Goiás until the end of that year.

In November 2020, Bernando joined Hong Kong Premier League club Pegasus.

On 12 February 2021, Bernardo terminated his contract with Pegasus to return to Brazil and sign with Rio Branco.

Career statistics

Club
(Correct )

Honours
Cruzeiro
Campeonato Mineiro: 2009

Vasco da Gama
Copa do Brasil: 2011
Campeonato Carioca: 2015

References

External links
goal 

Bernardo at ZeroZero

1990 births
Living people
People from Sorocaba
Brazilian footballers
Brazil youth international footballers
Footballers at the 2007 Pan American Games
Campeonato Brasileiro Série A players
K League 1 players
Saudi First Division League players
Hong Kong Premier League players
Cruzeiro Esporte Clube players
CR Vasco da Gama players
Goiás Esporte Clube players
Santos FC players
Sociedade Esportiva Palmeiras players
Ulsan Hyundai FC players
Khaleej FC players
TSW Pegasus FC players
Expatriate footballers in South Korea
Brazilian expatriate sportspeople in South Korea
Expatriate footballers in Saudi Arabia
Brazilian expatriate sportspeople in Saudi Arabia
Expatriate footballers in Hong Kong
Brazilian expatriate sportspeople in Hong Kong
Association football midfielders
Pan American Games competitors for Brazil
Footballers from São Paulo (state)